Bonnot is a French surname. Notable people with the surname include:

 Alexandre Bonnot (born 1973), French footballer
 Françoise Bonnot (1939–2018), French film editor 
 Jules Bonnot (1876–1912), French anarchist, leader of "La Bande à Bonnot"
 Marcel Bonnot (born 1946), French politician

See also
 Bonnaud, former commune in France
 Bonneau (disambiguation)
 Bonnot Gang ("La Bande à Bonnot"), a French criminal anarchist group
 Bono (disambiguation)
 Saint-Bonnot, a commune in France
 Villard-Bonnot, a commune in France

French-language surnames